The 2007 Wellington City mayoral election was part of the 2007 New Zealand local elections. On 13 October 2007, elections were held for the Mayor of Wellington plus other local government roles. Kerry Prendergast was elected for a third consecutive term as mayor of Wellington.

Candidates
There were eleven candidates in the election:

Ray Ahipene-Mercer, Councillor for the Eastern Ward since 2000
Paul Bailey, a strategic marketing business consultant
Carl Gifford, an artist and stonemason
Rob Goulden, Councillor for the Eastern Ward since 1998
Nick Kelly, a bus driver, trade unionist and former chairperson of the  electorate committee of the Labour Party stood for the Workers Party
John McGrath, a local restaurateur
Bryan Pepperell, Councillor for the Southern Ward since 1996
Kerry Prendergast, Incumbent Mayor since 2001
Helene Ritchie, Councillor for the Northern Ward since 1998
Jack Ruben, former city councillor
Nick Wang, a journalist and the editor of the Capital Chinese News

Campaign
McGrath's campaign was filled with controversies. During the campaign he used an image of Auckland Mayor Dick Hubbard on a billboard without permission and was forced to admit he owed up to $40,000 from the launch of his bar which he later sold. His campaign manager resigned, claiming he owed her money. After the election he failed to file his candidate spending figures, blaming it on his accountant.

Results
The following table shows detailed results:

Ward results

Candidates were also elected from wards to the Wellington City Council.

References

Mayoral elections in Wellington
2007 elections in New Zealand
Politics of the Wellington Region
2000s in Wellington